Austin & Ally is an American comedy television series created by Kevin Kopelow and Heath Seifert that aired on Disney Channel from December 2, 2011 to January 10, 2016. The series stars Ross Lynch, Laura Marano, Raini Rodriguez, and Calum Worthy.

Set in Miami, Florida, the series focuses on the relationship between two very different musicians: extroverted and fun-loving singer and instrumentalist Austin Moon and introverted and awkward songwriter Ally Dawson, who is also a singer, but has a bad case of stage fright.

Series overview

Episodes

Season 1 (2011–12)

Season 2 (2012–13)

Season 3 (2013–14)

Season 4 (2015–16)

References 

Lists of American children's television series episodes
Lists of American comedy television series episodes
Lists of Disney Channel television series episodes